The yellow-faced flameback (Chrysocolaptes xanthocephalus) is a species of bird in the family Picidae. It is found on the Philippine islands of Negros and Panay. It is extinct on Guimaras, Masbate, and Ticao (extinct) . It is one of the most spectacular woodpeckers with its bright yellow head and crimson red back. It is sometimes considered a subspecies of the greater flameback. It is found in moist lowland forests including primary, secondary and even plantations and clearings provided there are still standing trees. It is the rarest woodpecker in the country and it is threatened by habitat loss.

Description 
EBird describes the bird as "A rare large woodpecker of lowland and foothill forest with at least some large trees in the central Philippines. Has a red back, a black tail, a yellow belly and cheek, and a black neck with large white spots. Note the crown sloping to an angular crest, which is bright red in males and yellow in females. Unmistakable in its range. Voice includes loud, ringing calls: “geek-geek-geek!”."

They exhibit sexual dimorphism in which males have red crests and the females have yellow crests.

Habitat and Conservation Status 
Found in primary forest, mature secondary forest to lighter secondary forest with dense under-storey, dense riparian vegetation but also in mango groves and close to human settlements and breeds between February and August. The highest known elevation for the yellow-faced flameback appears to be 900 m on Kanlaon, Negros and it appears to be a lowland forest specialist.

IUCN has assessed this bird as endangered with the population being estimated at 250 to 999 mature individuals. This species' main threat is habitat loss.

Habitat loss on both Negros and Panay has been extensive. Primary forests have been almost totally destroyed on Negros (where just 4% of any type of forest cover remained in 1988) and Panay (where 8% remained). Habitat degradation, through clearance for agriculture, timber and charcoal-burning, continues to pose a serious threat to remaining fragments. In 2002 remaining forest at all elevations on Negros and Panay was calculated at 501 km2 and 984 km2 respectively but the current figure is doubtless much lower, and lowland forest makes up an increasingly small proportion of the total. There may be little if any suitable forest remaining on Guimaras, Masbate and Ticao.

It is recommended to conduct surveys in potentially suitable habitat in order to calculate density estimates, and calculate remaining extent of suitable habitat to refine the population estimate. Encourage careful reforestation activities around remaining forests and law enforcement to stop small-scale yet rampant illegal logging.

References

Collar, N.J. 2011. Species limits in some Philippine birds including the Greater Flameback Chrysocolaptes lucidus. Forktail number 27: 29–38.

yellow-faced flameback
Endemic birds of the Philippines
Birds of Negros Island
Birds of Panay
Fauna of Guimaras
Fauna of Masbate
yellow-faced flameback